Kristian Edland (born 12 April 1874) was a Norwegian farmer and politician.

He was born in Mosterøy to farmers David Edland and Serina Døskeland. He was elected representative to the Storting for the periods 1934–1936 and 1937–1945, for the Liberal Party. He served as mayor of Mosterøy from 1925 to 1931.

References

1874 births
Year of death missing
People from Rennesøy
Norwegian farmers
Mayors of places in Rogaland
Liberal Party (Norway) politicians
Members of the Storting